Ringling Bros. World's Greatest Shows is a circus founded in Baraboo, Wisconsin, United States in 1884 by five of the seven Ringling brothers: Albert, August, Otto, Alfred T., Charles, John, and Henry. The Ringling brothers were sons of a German immigrant, August Frederick Rüngeling, who changed his name to Ringling once he settled in America. Four brothers were born in McGregor, Iowa: Alf T., Charles, John and Henry. The Ringling family lived in McGregor, Iowa, for twelve years, from 1860 until 1872. The family then lived in Prairie du Chien, Wisconsin, and moved to Baraboo, Wisconsin, in 1875.
In 1907 Ringling Bros. acquired the Barnum & Bailey Circus, merging them in 1919 to become Ringling Bros. and Barnum & Bailey Circus, promoted as The Greatest Show on Earth. Ringling Bros. and Barnum & Bailey closed on May 21, 2017, following weakening attendance and high operating costs.

On Wednesday, May 18, 2022, the company announced that it will officially return, with its first show on Sept. 28, 2023, and a tour of more than 50 cities, but without any animals.

History

In 1882, before the Ringling brothers created their first circus, the five brothers performed skits and juggling routines in town halls around the state of Wisconsin. Their first show was on November 27, 1882, in Mazomanie, Wisconsin. They called this the "Ringling Bros. Variety Performance" when they took the show to the next town. With two wandering performers the next year, the brothers toured the Northwest. After the Northwest tour, they used the money earned for suits.

They expanded their acts into a one ring show in 1884. The show added a trick horse and a bear at the end of the season. The circus started traveling by trains in 1888 allowing the show to consistently expand.

Ringling Circus purchased the Yankee Robinson Circus and opened a joint show on May 19, 1884. This brought them to the attention of James Anthony Bailey of Barnum and Bailey's Circus as a viable competitor. The brothers met with Bailey thus agreeing to a division of areas. This was followed by them purchasing a half share of the Adam Forepaugh Sells Brothers Circus from Bailey. Bailey, under the area division, prohibited the Ringlings from playing at the Madison Garden, a location it was the brothers' ambition to perform at. In 1887 Ringling Circus changed its official title to the "Ringling Bros. United Monster Shows, Great Double Circus, Royal European Menagerie, Museum, Caravan, and Congress of Trained Animals."

In 1906, Bailey died, which led to the Ringlings taking over Forepaugh–Sells, which continued to operate separately. In October 1907, the stockholders of Barnum and Bailey's Circus approved the sale of the circus to the Ringlings. Due to declining audiences and employees being drafted for World War I, Ringling Circus and Barnum and Bailey's Circus were merged in 1919 as Ringling Bros. and Barnum & Bailey Circus.

References

External links

Ringling Collection of images of 19th century American and British actors and actresses

Circuses
Ringling Bros. and Barnum & Bailey Circus